Gillian Hilma James  (born 6 December 1934) is a former Australian politician. She was born in Launceston, Tasmania. James was first elected to the Tasmanian Parliament in 1976, when she won a seat in Bass for the Labor Party. She held the seat until she was defeated in 1986, but she returned in 1992 and served until her retirement in 2002. James was the first female cabinet minister in Tasmanian history.
In 2005 James was inducted to the Tasmanian Honour Roll of Women for service to the community.

References

1934 births
Living people
Members of the Tasmanian House of Assembly
Members of the Order of Australia
Australian Labor Party members of the Parliament of Tasmania
21st-century Australian politicians
21st-century Australian women politicians
Women members of the Tasmanian House of Assembly